Liviu's Dream is a 2004 Romanian film directed by Corneliu Porumboiu.

Awards
In 2004, the film won best short at the Transilvania International Film Festival.

See also
 Romanian New Wave

References

External links

Romanian short films
2004 films
Films directed by Corneliu Porumboiu
2004 short films
2000s Romanian-language films